Camp Shelby is a military post whose North Gate is located at the southern boundary of Hattiesburg, Mississippi, on United States Highway 49.  It is the largest state-owned training site in the nation. During wartime, the camp's mission is to serve as a major independent mobilization station of the United States Army Forces Command (FORSCOM). Camp Shelby Joint Forces Training Center is the largest reserve component training site, covering , allowing up to battalion-level maneuver training, Gunnery Table 8-12, field artillery firing points and a wide range of support facilities. This is the normal Annual Training location for National Guard and Reserve units located in Mississippi, Alabama, and Tennessee. However, units from across the country use its assets to support a variety of missions. The 2nd Battalion, 114th Field Artillery conducts its gunnery training and has the bulk of its combat equipment stored in the Mobilization and Annual Training Equipment Site (MATES) located there.

Camp Shelby Joint Forces Training Center (CSJFTC), encompassing over 525 square kilometers, is located in portions of Perry and Forrest Counties, in south Mississippi. The training center was established during World War I and it has served almost continuously since then as a training site, not only for the Reserve Components of the Army, but also for the Active Components of the Army, Navy, Marine Corps, and Air Force. The training site consists of a mix of State, Department of Defense, and U.S. Forest Service lands in the DeSoto National Forest.

It is a training ground for the Abrams M1 Tank, Paladin Howitzers and home to the 3rd Brigade 87th Division Training Support. Camp Shelby serves as a training site for National Guardsmen and Reservists from throughout the country hosting as many as 100,000 personnel annually.

History
Camp Shelby was established in 1917. The post was named in honor of Isaac Shelby, Indian fighter, Revolutionary War hero and 1st Governor of Kentucky, by the first troops to train here, the 38th Division.

In 1934, the State of Mississippi acquired the site for use as a summer camp by the National Guard. Because of Camp Shelby's natural advantages of climate and location, plus a great variety of terrain including part of the Ragland Hills, it was reopened in 1940 as a federal installation. Some of the divisions that have trained in Mississippi include the 31st, 37th, 38th, 43rd, 63rd, 65th, 69th, 85th, 94th, and the 99th Divisions.

The famous Japanese-American 442nd Regimental Combat Team and the 100th Battalion trained here in preparation for World War II (See the 1951 movie Go For Broke! and the 2006 movie Only the Brave). Women's Army Corps (WAC) units also trained here. The post contained a large convalescent hospital and had a prisoner of war camp which housed soldiers of the famous German Afrika Korps.  Camp Shelby is also home to the Mississippi Armed Forces Museum.  The history of Camp Shelby is significant part of the museum's collection.

The post closed shortly after the end of World War II. During the Korean War, Camp Shelby was established as an emergency railhead facility.

In the summer of 1954, non-divisional National Guard units trained at Camp Shelby and in 1956, it was designated a permanent training site by Continental Army Command (now FORSCOM). Over 5,000 troops were processed through Camp Shelby during Desert Storm operations.

The 199th Light Infantry Brigade trained at Camp Shelby from September to November 1966 in preparation for deployment to Vietnam from Fort Benning Georgia. The 199th was the only combat unit to train at Camp Shelby during the Vietnam War.

Camp Shelby was federalized as a FORSCOM Mobilization Center on June 6, 2004. Since then, several Regimental or Brigade Combat Teams have mobilized through Camp Shelby including the 278th Armored Cavalry Regiment (Tennessee Army National Guard); the 155th Heavy Brigade Combat Team (MS ARNG); the 2nd Brigade Combat Team, 28th Infantry Division (PA ARNG); the 56th Stryker Brigade Combat Team, 28th Infantry Division (PA ARNG) ; the 53rd Brigade Combat Team (FL ARNG); the 1st Brigade Combat Team, 34th Infantry Division (MN ARNG); the 41st Brigade Combat Team (OR ARNG); the 256th Infantry Brigade Combat Team (LA ARNG); the 116th Cavalry Brigade Combat Team (ID ARNG), the 27th Infantry Brigade Combat Team (NY ARNG), and the 48th Infantry Brigade Combat Team (GA ARNG).

U.S. Navy Seabee units homeported or mobilized from the Naval Construction Battalion Center in Gulfport, Mississippi utilize Camp Shelby as the site for their Field Training Exercises (FTX).

Camp Shelby is also home to the Youth Challenge Academy (a military structured GED and State High School diploma program established in 1994 to aid Mississippi High school dropouts, ages 16 to 18, designed and operated by the National Guard Bureau).

In mid-2007, the Air National Guard opened a new combat training runway at Camp Shelby.  The  Shelby Auxiliary Field One is one of only two facilities in the world designed for C-17 Globemaster III short-field landing training. It was constructed to meet Air Force C-17 training requirements.

Contingency Operating Location 3 at Camp Shelby is used for Air Force Reserve Officer Training Corps field training.

Mobilization support
The 278th Armored Cavalry Regiment of the Tennessee Army National Guard mobilized twice for Iraq deployment. First in June-September 2004 for OIF 3 and demobilized in October 2005. The entire 386th Engineer Battalion from the Texas Army National Guard based in Corpus Christi Texas was attached to the 278th for the first Iraq Deployment. The Regiment mobilized a second time for deployment to Iraq in December 2009 to February 2010 and demobilized in August 2010.
The 32nd Infantry Brigade Combat Team and the 121st Field Artillery Regiment (United States) of the Wisconsin Army National Guard mobilized battalions for Iraq and Kuwait from August 2005 to June 2006 in rotation.
The 56th Stryker Brigade Combat Team (SBCT) of the Pennsylvania Army National Guard, mobilized for Iraq deployment between August to November 2008.
The 168th Engineer Brigade mobilized from Camp Shelby for its deployment to Afghanistan in 2009.
The 136th Military Police Battalion (IR) of the Texas Army National Guard based in Tyler, Texas mobilized for deployment to Afghanistan in April 2009 and demobilized in 2010.
The 256th Infantry Brigade of the Louisiana Army National Guard mobilized for Iraq deployment between January to March 2010 and demobilized in December 2011.
The 45th Infantry Brigade Combat Team of the Oklahoma Army National Guard mobilized for Afghanistan deployment between April to May 2011 and demobilized in 2012.
The 27th Infantry Brigade Combat Team of the New York Army National Guard and 4th Battalion 118th Infantry Regiment of the South Carolina Army National Guard mobilized for Afghanistan and Kuwait deployment between January to April 2012 and demobilized in 2013.

See also 
 Camp Shelby burrowing crayfish is named after the base

References

External links 
 Camp Shelby Website
 Mississippi Armed Forces Museum

Buildings and structures in Forrest County, Mississippi
Buildings and structures in Perry County, Mississippi
Shelby
Shelby
World War II prisoner of war camps in the United States
1917 establishments in Mississippi